The Woman on the Beach  is a 1947 film noir directed by Jean Renoir and starring Joan Bennett, Robert Ryan and Charles Bickford. It was released by RKO Radio Pictures. The film is a love triangle drama about Scott, a conflicted U.S. Coast Guard officer (Ryan), and his pursuit of Peggy, a married woman (Bennett). Peggy is married to Tod, a blind former artist (Bickford).

Plot
Scott, a mounted Coast Guard officer, has recurring nightmares involving a maritime tragedy. He sees himself immersed in an eerie landscape surrounded by a shipwreck and walking over skeletons at the bottom of the sea, while a ghostly blonde woman beckons him from afar. He thinks he is going mad. He proposes to Eve Geddes, a young woman working at a local shipyard catering to the Coast Guard. She accepts. Eve has a strong resemblance to the ghostly blonde of his nightmares.

While riding by the seaside on his horse Scott meets Peggy, the mysterious wife of Tod, who was a painter before going blind. He rides by her as she stands near a shipwreck protruding from the sand, like an eerie echo from his nightmares. After a conversation, they discover that they share similar metaphysical anxieties. A bond develops between the two, but the situation becomes tangled when Tod tries to befriend Scott. Tod's attitude toward Scott is ambivalent. The retired artist tests Peggy and Scott to gauge how far they could go in their relationship. Tod tells Peggy that he knows she could never leave him and that he finds Scott, a much younger man, virile but banal.

Tod cannot come to terms with the fact that, because of his blindness, he can not paint any more. He tells Scott that dead painters' works always appreciate in value. He expects the value of own his paintings to increase, considering he is now 'dead' as a painter.

Scott is suspicious of Tod's motives, and also suspects that Tod is not actually blind. Scott is increasingly interested in Peggy, and she returns his attentions. Scott sets up and outing to test Tod. He him near the edge of a cliff, thinking that he will be forced to see and therefore avoid falling. However, Tod falls. After this mishap, he eventually recovers. Soon after the mishap, Tod is abusive toward Peggy when he realizes that she has hidden his masterpiece, his nude portrait of her. Seeing this, Scott tries to protect Peggy.

Eve, because of Scott's infatuation with Peggy, becomes distant and asks Scott to delay their marriage plans. Scott attempts to drown both Tod and himself during a fishing trip. Peggy alerts the authorities, and Tod and Scott are rescued by the Coast Guard.

Tod burns all his paintings along with the house he and Peggy live in. Peggy frantically tries to stop Tod and save the paintings. She fails, and Scott forces her out of the collapsing house. After they have moved safely away, Scott asks Tod why he did it. Tod says the paintings were a symbol of the obsession he had with his previous, sighted life. He asks Peggy to take him to New York City, where they have happy memories of their earlier life together. He tells her that afterwards, she may "do as she pleases". Peggy embraces Tod, and Scott leaves them.

Cast
 Joan Bennett as Peggy Butler
 Robert Ryan as Scott Burnett
 Charles Bickford as Tod Butler
 Nan Leslie as Eve Geddes
 Walter Sande as Otto Wernecke
 Irene Ryan as Mrs. Wernecke
 Glen Vernon as Kirk
 Frank Darien as Lars
 Jay Norris as Jimmy

Production
The Woman on the Beach was based upon the novel None So Blind by Mitchell A. Wilson, and had the working title Desirable Woman. RKO Pictures offered Joan Bennett the starring role in 1946, hoping to capitalize on her recent success with the films noir The Woman in the Window and Scarlet Street. Bennett was allowed to choose as director Jean Renoir, who had been France's premiere director before fleeing from the Nazis to Hollywood in 1940. Charles Koerner, the RKO chief of staff, promised carte blanche to Renoir, and even helped craft the story to Renoir's vision of the film. Renoir chose Val Lewton as producer, however Lewton left soon after shooting began, in effect leaving Renoir as his own producer. His freedom was productive; the shooting went so well that Renoir and the cast were even able to improvise on set. Soon after, Koerner died. Whereas he had balanced his business acumen with an appreciation for the artistry of movie making, the new executives were baffled by Renoir's film. A consumer preview was held, attended by high school and college students who were uninterested in the movie's dark themes. After the catastrophic preview, Renoir spent the next six months reediting the film, even reshooting several sections, causing him much distress. It was ultimately released in 1947 as The Woman on the Beach.

Reception
The film recorded a loss of $610,000.

The staff at Variety liked the film and wrote, "Thesping is uniformly excellent with the cast from top to bottom responding to Renoir's controlling need for a surcharged atmosphere. In subtle counterpoint to the film's surface vagueness, the settings are notably realistic in their size and quality. Choice camerawork sustains the film's overall impact while sweeping through the entire production is a magnificent score by Hanns Eisler which heightens all of the film's pictorial values."  In 1992, Leonard Maltin was less complimentary, calling the film an "overheated melodrama" and noting it was "easy to see why this was Renoir's American swan song."

References

External links
 
 
 
 
 The Woman on the Beach informational site and DVD review at DVD Beaver (includes images)
 The Woman on the Beach at Film Noir of the Week by Wheeler Winston Dixon
  from Warner Bros. Archive

1947 films
1947 drama films
American black-and-white films
Film noir
Films about blind people
Films about the United States Coast Guard
Films based on American novels
Films directed by Jean Renoir
RKO Pictures films
American drama films
1940s English-language films
1940s American films